"Desire" is the seventh single by the Japanese pop and rock band Do As Infinity, released in 2001. "Desire" and "Carnaval" are almost the same songs but "Carnaval" was meant to be written from a male perspective while "Desire" described a female perspective in the lyrics. This single is the last by Do As Infinity to include a remix.

This song was included in the band's compilation albums Do the Best and Do the A-side.

Track listing
"Desire"
"Holiday"
"Carnaval"
"Faces" (3SVRemix)
"Desire" (Instrumental)
"Holiday" (Instrumental)
"Carnaval" (Instrumental)

Chart positions

External links
 "Desire" at Avex Network
 "Desire" at Oricon

2001 singles
Do As Infinity songs
Songs written by Dai Nagao
Song recordings produced by Seiji Kameda
2001 songs
Avex Trax singles